Richard Jewell is a 2019 American biographical drama film directed and produced by Clint Eastwood and written by Billy Ray. It is based on the 1997 Vanity Fair article "American Nightmare: The Ballad of Richard Jewell" by Marie Brenner and the 2019 book The Suspect: An Olympic Bombing, the FBI, the Media, and Richard Jewell, the Man Caught in the Middle by Kent Alexander and Kevin Salwen. The film depicts the July 27 Centennial Olympic Park bombing and its aftermath, as security guard Richard Jewell finds a bomb during the 1996 Summer Olympics in Atlanta, Georgia, and alerts authorities to evacuate, only to later be wrongly accused of having placed the device himself. The film stars Paul Walter Hauser as Jewell, alongside Sam Rockwell, Kathy Bates, Jon Hamm, and Olivia Wilde.

The film had its world premiere on November 20, 2019, at the AFI Fest, and was theatrically released in the United States on December 13, 2019, by Warner Bros. Pictures. It received positive reviews from critics, with praise for the performances (particularly Bates, Rockwell and Hauser) and Eastwood's direction. However, the film was criticized for its portrayal of a real-life reporter, Kathy Scruggs. It was chosen by the National Board of Review as one of the ten best films of the year. The film grossed $43.7 million against its $45 million budget. For her performance, Bates won the National Board of Review Award for Best Supporting Actress and earned nominations at the Academy Awards and Golden Globes.

Plot
In 1986, Richard Jewell works as an office supply clerk at the Small Business Administration, where he builds a rapport with attorney Watson Bryant. Eventually, Jewell leaves the firm to pursue a law enforcement career. At one point, Jewell is hired as a sheriff's deputy, but ends up discharged. In early 1996, he works as a security guard at Piedmont College, but is fired after multiple complaints of acting beyond his jurisdiction. Jewell later moves in with his mother Bobi in Atlanta. In the summer of 1996, he works as a security guard at the Olympic Games, monitoring Centennial Park.

In the early morning of July 27, 1996, after chasing off drunken revelers during a Jack Mack and the Heart Attack concert, Jewell notices a suspicious package beneath a bench, which an explosives expert confirms contains a bomb. The security team, police officers, FBI agent Tom Shaw, and Jewell's friend Dave Dutchess move concert attendees away from the bomb before it detonates, and Jewell is heralded as a hero.

After being contacted by the dean of Piedmont College about his dislike and suspicions of Jewell, Shaw and his team determine that Jewell, as a white, male, "wanna-be" police officer, fits the common profile of perpetrators committing similar crimes; they compare him to others who sought glory and attention by rescuing people from a dangerous situation they created themselves.

Shaw is approached by journalist Kathy Scruggs of the Atlanta-Journal Constitution, and he reveals that Jewell is under FBI suspicion. The Constitution publishes Scruggs' story on the front page, disclosing the FBI's interest in Jewell as a possible suspect. Scruggs makes particular note of Jewell being overweight, the fact he lives with his mother, and work history to reassure herself that he fits the FBI's profile. The story quickly becomes international news.

Jewell, initially unaware of his changing public perception, is lured to the FBI office. Though initially cooperative, he refuses to sign an acknowledgement he has been read his Miranda rights and instead phones Bryant for legal representation. Bryant, now running his own struggling law firm, agrees and makes Jewell aware he is a prime suspect in the bombing.

Shaw and his partner Sam Bennet visit the dean of Piedmont College, who reinforces their suspicion of Jewell. The FBI searches Jewell's home and seizes property including true crime books and a cache of firearms. Jewell admits to Bryant that he has been evading income taxes for years and was once arrested for exceeding his authority. Bryant scolds Jewell for being too collegial with the police officers investigating him, and Jewell admits his ingrained respect for authority makes it difficult for him not to be deferential, even when the authorities are working against him.

Jewell and Bryant confront Scruggs, demanding a retraction and apology, but she stands by her reporting. Still not completely convinced of Jewell's innocence, Bryant and his secretary Nadya time the distance between the phone booth which was discovered to have made the initial threat of the bomb, and the bomb site, concluding it is impossible for someone to phone in the bomb threat and discover the bomb at the time it was found. Scruggs and Shaw come to the same conclusion, and the FBI changes their picture of the crime to include an accomplice. As their case weakens, the FBI try to link Dutchess to Jewell as a possible accomplice and lover.

Bryant arranges a polygraph examination, which Jewell passes, removing Bryant's doubt about his innocence. Bobi holds a press conference and pleads for the investigation to cease so she and her son may proceed with their lives. Jewell and Bryant meet with Shaw and Bennet at the FBI office, and after some irrelevant questions, Jewell realizes they have no evidence against him. When he asks pointedly if they are ready to charge him, their silence convinces him to leave.

Eighty-eight days after being named "a person of interest", Jewell is informed by formal letter that he is no longer under investigation.

In April 2003, Jewell, now a police officer in Luthersville, Georgia, is visited by Bryant who tells him that Eric Rudolph has confessed to the Centennial Olympic Park bombing.

An epilogue states that on August 29, 2007, Jewell died at the age of 44 of complications from diabetes and heart failure. It also mentions that Bryant and Nadya got married and had two sons, both of whom Bobi babysits to this day.

Cast

Production
The project was initially announced in February 2014, when Leonardo DiCaprio and Jonah Hill teamed to produce the film, with Hill set to play Jewell, and DiCaprio set to play the lawyer who helped Jewell navigate the media blitz that surrounded him. Paul Greengrass began negotiations to direct the film, with Billy Ray writing the screenplay. Other directors considered include Ezra Edelman, known for the 2016 documentary O.J.: Made in America, and David O. Russell, before Clint Eastwood was officially attached in early 2019. DiCaprio and Hill did not star in the film, though they remained as producers.

In May 2019, Warner Bros. acquired the film rights from 20th Century Fox, which had been acquired by The Walt Disney Company earlier that year. In June, Sam Rockwell was cast as the lawyer, and Paul Walter Hauser as Jewell. Kathy Bates, Olivia Wilde, Jon Hamm, and Ian Gomez were also cast. In July 2019, Nina Arianda joined the cast. Filming began on June 24, 2019, in Atlanta.

In an interview with Ellen DeGeneres during her talk show, Eastwood explained how he continued to work on the film despite a looming studio wildfire. Ellen described the November 10 blaze, known as the Barham brush fire, as a "really bad fire that came really close to the lot," adding that "air quality was so bad that everyone evacuated." Clint replied: "I was coming back down to do some work at a sound stage and I saw all this smoke going. And I'm getting closer and closer and its Warner Bros. and its smoke and I got almost up there and I thought, the whole studio's burning down, maybe I'll go in and see if I can retrieve something. So we went on the sound stage and started working and we forgot about it and...everybody said, 'The studio's been evacuated!' And I said, 'We're not evacuated, we're here working!'"

Release
Richard Jewell premiered at the AFI Fest on November 20, 2019 and was theatrically released in the United States on December 13, 2019, by Warner Bros. Pictures.

A trailer for the film was released on October 3, 2019.

Reception

Box office
Richard Jewell grossed $22.3 million in the United States and Canada, and $21.3 million in other territories, for a worldwide total of $43.7 million, against a production budget of $45 million. The film's performance was characterized as a box office flop by several media outlets.

In the United States and Canada, the film was released alongside Jumanji: The Next Level and Black Christmas, and was initially projected to gross around $10 million from 2,502 theaters in its opening weekend. However, after making $1.6 million on its first day, estimates were lowered to $5 million. The film ended up debuting at $4.7 million, one of the 50 worst wide openings ever. It was Eastwood's worst opening weekend since Bronco Billy in 1980, and the second-lowest opening of his career. It finished fourth at the box office, behind Jumanji: The Next Level, Frozen II, and Knives Out.

The film fell 45% to $2.6 million in its second weekend, finishing in seventh. In its third weekend the film made $3 million (and a total of $5.4 million over the five-day Christmas weekend), finishing tenth.

Critical response
The website's critical consensus reads, "Richard Jewell simplifies the real-life events that inspired it—yet still proves that Clint Eastwood remains a skilled filmmaker of admirable economy." Metacritic, another review aggregator, assigned the film a weighted average score of 68 out of 100 based on 45 critics, indicating "generally favorable reviews". Audiences polled by CinemaScore gave the film an average grade of "A" on an A+ to F scale.

Controversy
The film came under fire for its portrayal of The Atlanta Journal-Constitution reporter Kathy Scruggs, who had died of a prescription drug overdose in 2001. Criticism was directed at the film for depicting her as offering to engage in sex with an FBI agent in return for confidential information. The editor-in-chief of The Atlanta Journal-Constitution wrote in an open letter that this depicted incident was "entirely false and malicious". Employees of the newspaper demanded the film have a prominent disclaimer that "some events were imagined for dramatic purposes and artistic license." Critical commentators argued that the film perpetuates a sexist trope of women journalists exchanging sex for information. 

Wilde, who plays Scruggs in the film, defended her role and stated there was a sexist double standard, in that Jon Hamm's portrayal of the FBI agent was not held to the same scrutiny. In response it was argued that Wilde's character was based on a real person, whereas the FBI agent was an amalgamation of multiple individuals and that the purpose of the film was to expose and condemn the character assassination of Jewell.  However, in the process, some insisted the film committed the same act against Scruggs.

Accolades

References

External links
 
 
 Richard Jewel at History vs. Hollywood

2019 films
2019 biographical drama films
2010s historical drama films
2019 controversies in the United States
American biographical drama films
American historical drama films
Appian Way Productions films
Casting controversies in film
Drama films based on actual events
Film controversies
Film controversies in the United States
Films about the Federal Bureau of Investigation
Films about journalists
Films about the 1996 Summer Olympics
Films based on multiple works
Films based on newspaper and magazine articles
Films based on non-fiction books
Films directed by Clint Eastwood
Films produced by Clint Eastwood
Films produced by Leonardo DiCaprio
Films set in Atlanta
Films set in 1986
Films set in 1996
Films set in 2003
Films set in the 1990s
Films shot in Atlanta
Films with screenplays by Billy Ray
Political controversies in film
Obscenity controversies in film
Malpaso Productions films
Warner Bros. films
2019 drama films
2010s English-language films
2010s American films